Comazar is a company that operates railways in Africa.  Its stock is majority owned by the French investment group Bolloré.
Comazar was founded by Eric Peiffer and Patrick Claes in conjunction with Transnet (Spoornet) and Transurb Consult (a Belgian Railways subsidiary) in 1995.

The headquarters are in Johannesburg.

Related organizations 

Comazar owns stock in and operates the following privately held railways: 
 Camrail - Cameroon - 20 year concession from 1999.
 Madarail - Madagascar
 Sitarail Railways - Côte d'Ivoire and Burkina Faso
 Ethiopian Railways - 25 year concession from 2006.
Comazar is also a ten percent partner in Rift Valley Railways.

Previous concessions 

In addition, the company has operated railways in these countries in the past:
Sizarail - Democratic Republic of the Congo - The company obtained a 5-year mandate, starting in 1996, to run the country's rail.  Comazar started a commuter rail service in Lubumbashi that carried 2 mm passengers per year.  Ridership had more than doubled in 2 years of operation, but the government of the Democratic Republic of the Congo cancelled the company's management mandate and confiscated all assets in 1997.
Trans Africa Railway Corporation Tanzania Ltd (TARC) - Tanzania - the company withdrew from its participation in this project in 2002, after 4 years of work. See Tanzania Railways Corporation, currently operated by Rites Consortium of India.

External links 
Comazar 
Comazar's page on MBendi

Rail transport in Ethiopia
Rail transport in Burkina Faso
Rail transport in Cameroon
Rail transport in Ivory Coast
Rail transport in Madagascar
Rail transport in Tanzania
Companies based in Johannesburg
Railway companies of South Africa
Railway companies established in 1995
Rail transport in the Democratic Republic of the Congo